The men's artistic team competition at the 2018 Asian Games was held on 20 and 22 August 2018 at the Jakarta International Expo Hall D2.

Schedule
All times are Western Indonesia Time (UTC+07:00)

Results 
Legend
DNS — Did not start

Qualification

Final

References

External links
 Gymnastics at the 2018 Asian Games – Men's artistic team all-around qualification
 Gymnastics at the 2018 Asian Games – Men's artistic team all-around final

Artistic Men Team